The Alpi Pioneer 300 is an Italian ultralight and light-sport aircraft, designed produced by Alpi Aviation, of Pordenone. The aircraft is supplied as a kit for amateur construction.

Design and development
The Pioneer 300 was derived from the Asso V Champion and designed to comply with the Fédération Aéronautique Internationale microlight rules, as well as the US light-sport aircraft rules. It features a cantilever low-wing, a two-seats-in-side-by-side configuration enclosed cockpit under a bubble canopy, a choice of fixed or retractable tricycle landing gear and a single engine in tractor configuration. The fixed landing gear version is intended for the US light-sport aircraft category that does not permit retractable gear on landplanes.

The aircraft is made with a wooden frame, covered with composite skin panels. Its  span wing is tapered in planform. Standard engines available are the  Rotax 912ULS,  Jabiru 2200 and  Jabiru 3300.

Variants
Pioneer 300 Standard
Base model, standard engine is the  Rotax 912ULS.
Pioneer 300 Hawk
Model with upgraded canopy and interior, with plywood wing skins and oleo strut suspension.
Pioneer 300 Kite
Pioneer 300 Turbo
Pioneer 330 Acro
Aerobatic model, with inverted-capable version of the  Rotax 912ULS and a strengthened airframe with flight load factors of +6/-3g.

Specifications (Pioneer 300)

References

External links

2000s Italian ultralight aircraft
Homebuilt aircraft
Light-sport aircraft
Alpi Aviation aircraft
Single-engined tractor aircraft
Low-wing aircraft